The Jamaican caracara (Caracara tellustris) is a prehistoric species of terrestrial bird in the falcon family, Falconidae.  It was native to the island of Jamaica in the Caribbean, where it probably inhabited dry forests in the island's south during the early Holocene. This species was described based on fossils discovered in the Skeleton Cave in the Jackson's Bay Cave system on the south coast of Portland Ridge.

Description 
Caracara tellustris was large and had diminished wings; it was probably mostly terrestrial and may have been flightless. It probably had a lifestyle similar to that of the secretary bird of Africa. It likely became extinct following Paleo-Indian colonization of the island during the Quaternary extinction event, but it may have survived up to European colonization of the island, after which habitat destruction and invasive species wiped it out before it could be described by naturalists.

References

Jamaican caracara
Late Quaternary prehistoric birds
Holocene extinctions
Extinct animals of Jamaica
Extinct flightless birds
Extinct birds of the Caribbean
Jamaican caracara